Martín Eulogio Rodríguez Custodio  (born 24 September 1968) is a former Peruvian footballer.

Club career
Rodríguez played for a number of clubs in Peru, including Universitario de Deportes and Deportivo Municipal. He also had a spell with Ionikos in the Greek Super League from January 1998 through July 2000.

International career
Rodríguez made 19 appearances for the senior Peru national football team from 1991 to 1995, including three matches at the 1995 Copa América.

References

External links
 

1968 births
Living people
Footballers from Lima
Association football midfielders
Peruvian footballers
Peru international footballers
1991 Copa América players
1995 Copa América players
Peruvian Primera División players
Super League Greece players
Club Universitario de Deportes footballers
Deportivo Municipal footballers
Ionikos F.C. players
Cienciano footballers
Atromitos F.C. players
Peruvian expatriate footballers
Expatriate footballers in Greece